SailFin was an open-source Java application server project led by Sun Microsystems. It implements the JCP SIP Servlet 1.1 (JSR 289) specification integrated with the open-source Java EE application server GlassFish.

SailFin effectively extends the GlassFish application server to meet the needs of communication and multimedia applications. By leveraging GlassFish as a basis, SailFin offers management, HA and clustering features along with the performance and scale to meet critical service-deployments.

SailFin, based on code donated to open source by Sun, Oracle Corporation, and Ericsson, was launched at Java ONE in May 2007. Sun also offered commercial support for SailFin under the product name "Sun GlassFish Communications Server".

This project was archived and effectively discontinued.

References

External links 
 
 JSR 359 Reference Implementation for Oracle WebLogic Server
 JSR 116: SIP Servlet API
 JSR 289: SIP Servlet v1.1
 JSR 359: SIP Servlet 2.0

Java enterprise platform
Free software application servers
Sun Microsystems software